Nippon Television Network System (NNS) is a Japanese television network organized by The Yomiuri Shimbun Holdings through its subsidiary NTV. NTV feeds entertainment and other non-news programming over NNS to 29 affiliated stations.

Distribution of national television news bulletins is handled by Nippon News Network, another network set up by NTV.

Nippon News Network stations

References

External links
 Nippon TV

Television networks in Japan
Television channels and stations established in 1972